Poggio Nativo is a  (municipality) in the Province of Rieti in the Italian region of Latium, located about  northeast of Rome and about  southwest of Rieti.

Poggio Nativo borders the following municipalities: Casaprota, Castelnuovo di Farfa, Frasso Sabino, Mompeo, Nerola, Poggio Moiano, Scandriglia, Toffia.

Poggio Nativo is home to the Santacittarama Theravada Buddhist monastery. Economy is mostly based on agriculture (cereals, olives, vines, fruit) and cattle raising.

Among the main landmarks is the San Paolo church and former monastery.

References

Cities and towns in Lazio